Baofeng County is a county under the administration of the prefecture-level city of Pingdingshan, in the west-central part of Henan Province, China.

It is 16 kilometers (10 miles) to Pingdingshan. Baofeng county is an important hub of communications in the central and western parts of Henan province.  In 1120, the second year under the reign of Emperor Huizong in the Song Dynasty, the emperor named the county Baofeng, because it had rich resources and flourishing businesses, including a distilled spirit brewery, official porcelain production and iron smelting. In 1643, the 16th year of Emperor Chongzhen, Li Zicheng renamed Baofeng Baozhou. The name was returned to Baofeng during the Qing Dynasty. Today Baofeng is a county under the jurisdiction of Pingdingshan.

Baofeng county has more than 20 varieties of rich mineral resources including steam coal, metal coal, bauxite, silica, clays, top lime and limestone.

Administrative divisions
As 2012, this county is divided to 1 subdistrict, 8 towns and 4 townships.
Subdistricts
Tielu Subdistrict

Towns

Townships

Climate

Transportation
The county is served by Pingdingshan West railway station and Baofeng railway station.

References

External links

County-level divisions of Henan
Pingdingshan